This is a list of fictional items from the DC Comics series Legion of Super-Heroes.

A
Anti-lead serum - invented by Brainiac 5, this serum cures Mon-El of his fatal lead weakness. Mon-El must take the serum every 48 hours or risk succumbing to lead poisoning. One of the ingredients is kryptonite. First introduced in Adventure Comics #305 (1963).

F
Legion Flight Ring - rings worn by Legionnaires which allow them to fly and communicate with each other. The history of their invention has changed with differing versions of the Legion.
Flying belt - the precursor to the flight ring. After the invention of the flight ring, the Legion gave out flying belts as consolation prizes to rejected applicants.

I
Image Inducer - a gadget used to project the appearance (and scent) of aliens so Legion member's could do stealth missions among alien species.
Inertron - the densest substance in the universe, and regularly used by the Legion as a shielding material. The walls of the Legion Clubhouse are composed of an inertron/manganium alloy, which can stand up to one of Superboy's punches.

M
Miracle Machine - presented to the Legion by the Controllers in Adventure Comics #367 (1968), this amazing machine can turn thoughts into reality. As the Legion consider it extremely dangerous, they seal it inside an inertron cube. The Miracle Machine is used to defeat the Time Trapper in DC Limited Collector's Edition #C-55 (1978). The Miracle Machine is eaten by Matter-Eater Lad in order to keep it from falling into enemy hands. Superman memorized the entire structure of the Miracle Machine while visiting the Legion, and later used it to destroy the essence of Darkseid.

O
Omnicoms - all-purpose handheld PCs used for scanning, sending messages, and reading, amongst other things.

T
Telepathic earplugs - devices used to allow sentients who do not speak the same languages to communicate. Can be used in one-way (where they translate only for the benefit of the wearer) or two-way mode.
Time Bubble - the Legion's original mode of time travel transportation. A present from Legion sponsor R.J. Brande, the Time Bubble can carry a small group of people anywhere in time and space. In post-Infinite Crisis continuity, the device is called a "Time Sphere".
Time Cube - similar to the Time Bubble. An invention of Rond Vidar, the Time Cube can project anyone to any point in time and space. It has some negative side effects, including reducing super-powers and temporarily deactivating some of the Legion's equipment.
Transuits - skintight transparent suits which allow the wearer to survive indefinitely in the vacuum of space, identifiable by the white armband visible while wearing.

V
Valorium - a dense metal and an alloy of Thanagarian Nth metal. A degravitised version was created by Brainiac 5 and used as the basis for the flight rings.
Vote-O-Matic - an electronic voting machine used by the Legion to elect its leaders. The machine has photographs of all the candidates. Members can vote for a specific candidate by pressing the button beneath the photo. First seen in Adventure Comics #304 (1963).

References

DC Comics objects
Items